Shal Rural District is in Shahrud District of Khalkhal County, Ardabil province, Iran. At the census of 2006, its population was 4,390 in 1,153 households; there were 3,503 inhabitants in 1,075 households at the following census of 2011; and in the most recent census of 2016, the population of the rural district was 3,210 in 1,165 households. The largest of its 23 villages was Shal, with 1,217 people.

References 

Khalkhal County

Rural Districts of Ardabil Province

Populated places in Ardabil Province

Populated places in Khalkhal County